Show Dem Camp (SDC) is a Nigerian rap duo composed of Wale Davies (Tec) and Olumide Ayeni (Ghost)

Personal lives 
The duo were born in Nigeria but lived and grew up in European cities and the United States before returning to Lagos to pursue a career in music. Tec was working in finance in Amsterdam prior to moving to Nigeria.

Career 
Tec and Ghost were solo rap artists, till they met at a battleground only to discover they had the same stage name "Golden Child". They soon came together afterward to form a rap duo with evolving stage names Loose Cannonz, BlackBoysDown, Third Eye Renegades and they eventually settled for Show Dem Camp. 
They have transitioned from being not just only rappers but to being a record label owner. 
Their first mixtape titled Clone Wars Vol. 1 dropped in the year 2010. They have since then released a number of albums under the Clone Wars Series and Palm Wine Music.

They have worked with a lot of Alté artists such as Tems, BOJ, Odunsi The Engine, Cruel Santino, Buju, Ladipoe, Wani and others.

Discography

Studio Albums 

 2010: Clone Wars i
 2011: The Dreamers Project
 2012: Clone Wars II (The Subsidy)
 2016: Clone Wars III (The Recession)
 2017: Palmwine Music 1 
 2018: Palmwine Music 2 
 2019: Palm Wine Express 
 2019: Clone Wars IV (These Buhari Times) 
 2021: Clone Wars V (The Algorhythm)
 2022: Palmwine Music 3

Awards and nominations

References 

Nigerian musical duos
Yoruba musicians
Living people
Year of birth missing (living people)